Dušan Kecman (Serbian Cyrillic: Душан Кецман; born November 6, 1977) is a Serbian professional basketball executive, coach and former player. During his playing career, he played both shooting guard and small forward positions.

Club career
Kecman started his basketball career with KK Beopetrol and he stayed there until the summer of 2001. He then transferred to FMP Železnik where he spent the entire 2001–02 season. In the summer of 2002, he moved to Partizan Belgrade and stayed there for two full seasons before leaving in the summer of 2004.

During the 2004–05 season he played for Makedonikos, Efes Pilsen and Oostende. In July 2004, Kecman signed with Greek team Makedonikos that will participate in the ULEB Cup next season. In December 2004, Kecman, along with teammate Dušan Jelić, decided to leave the club because of problems with payments. Only two weeks after, he signed with EFES Pilsen. Only a few months later, Kecman parted ways with the Turkish club and signed with Oostende, the last club he played for in that season.

He played the 2005–06 season in the Ukraine for Kyiv. In July 2006, he moved back to Partizan Belgrade.

On July 1, 2008, Kecman signed a two-year contract with the Greek League club Panathinaikos. On 16 June 2009, he was waived by the club after only one season.

He signed with Partizan Belgrade again on September 1, 2009. In 2010 he was involved in a memorable moment as he shot a last-second buzzer beater against Cibona as Partizan won the Adriatic League.

In August 2012 he signed a one-year contract with French team Chorale Roanne Basket. In August 2013, he signed with AS Monaco Basket. He was released after only four games.

Post–playing career
In September 2015, following the departure of Duško Vujošević, Kecman was named an assistant coach to the new team's head coach Petar Božić, with whom he played together in many title runs with Partizan.

In 2017, Kecman was named the team manager of Partizan. In August 2021, Partizan parted ways with him.

Career statistics

|-
| style="text-align:left;"| 2002–03
| style="text-align:left;" rowspan=2| Partizan
| 14 || 8 || 27.9 || .506 || .333 || .833 || 3.7 || 1.5 || 1.4 || .4 || 10.1 || 10.1
|-
| style="text-align:left;"| 2003–04
| 13 || 12 || 28.8 || .500 || .409 || .754 || 4.5 || 1.7 || 1.6 || .1 || 12.4 || 12.5
|-
| style="text-align:left;"| 2004–05
| style="text-align:left;"| Efes Pilsen
| 15 || 3 || 16.5 || .316 || .217 || .778 || 2.1 || .3 || .9 || .2 || 2.9 || 2.3
|-
| style="text-align:left;"| 2006–07
| style="text-align:left;" rowspan=2| Partizan
| 20 || 19 || 24.2 || .455 || .311 || .897 || 4.0 || 1.6 || 1.5 || .3 || 7.1 || 7.8
|-
| style="text-align:left;"| 2007–08
| 23 || 15 || 26.5 || .512 || .373 || .758 || 5.0 || 2.0 || 1.0 || .0 || 10.9 || 12.6
|-
| style="text-align:left;background:#AFE6BA;"| 2008–09†
| style="text-align:left;"| Panathinaikos
| 18 || 2 || 8.5 || .464 || .438 || 1.000 || 1.2 || .8 || .4 || .2 || 2.1 || 1.8
|-
| style="text-align:left;"| 2009–10
| style="text-align:left;" rowspan=3| Partizan
| 22 || 17 || 24.0 || .482 || .451 || .765 || 3.3 || 1.3 || .6 || .1 || 9.6 || 8.5
|-
| style="text-align:left;"| 2010–11
| 16 || 12 || 25.5 || .389 || .192 || .829 || 3.9 || 1.8 || .6 || .1 || 7.7 || 6.3
|-
| style="text-align:left;"| 2011–12
| 10 || 0 || 15.6 || .489 || .385 || .929 || 2.5 || 1.3 || .2 || .0 || 6.2 || 7.1
|- class="sortbottom"
| style="text-align:left;"| Career
| style="text-align:left;"|
| 151 || 88 || 22.2 || .469 || .353 || .802 || 3.4 || 1.4 || .9 || .2 || 7.8 || 7.8

Awards and accomplishments

 Yugoslavian League MVP (2001)
 Won 7 Serbian Championships (2003, 2004, 2007, 2008, 2010, 2011, 2012)
 Won 4 Serbian Cups (2008, 2010, 2011, 2012)
 Won 4 Adriatic Championships (2007, 2008, 2010, 2011)
 Won the Greek Cup (2009)
 Won the Greek Championship (2009)
 Won the Euroleague Championship (2009)
 Won the Triple Crown (2009)

References

External links

 Dušan Kecman at abaliga.com
 Dušan Kecman at eurobasket.com
 Dušan Kecman at euroleague.net

1977 births
Living people
ABA League players
Anadolu Efes S.K. players
BC Kyiv players
BC Oostende players
Chorale Roanne Basket players
KK Beopetrol/Atlas Beograd players
KK FMP (1991–2011) players
KK Partizan players
Makedonikos B.C. players
Panathinaikos B.C. players
Serbian basketball executives and administrators
Serbian men's basketball players
Serbian expatriate basketball people in Belgium
Serbian expatriate basketball people in Greece
Serbian expatriate basketball people in France
Serbian expatriate basketball people in Turkey
Serbian expatriate basketball people in Ukraine
Serbian men's basketball coaches
Shooting guards
Small forwards
Basketball players from Belgrade